Kent Åke "Kenta" Nilsson (born 31 August 1956) is a Swedish former professional ice hockey centre. He played in the World Hockey Association (WHA) for the Winnipeg Jets, and in the National Hockey League (NHL) for the Atlanta and Calgary Flames, Minnesota North Stars and Edmonton Oilers, as well as teams across various European leagues. During his NHL career he was called "Mr. Magic" and "The Magic Man", referring to his exceptional puck skills. Wayne Gretzky commented on Nilsson's skills saying "Skills-wise he might have been the most skilled hockey player I ever saw in my entire career". In 2006, he was featured on HCZ, a Swedish reality show as coach for a hockey team of non-athletes.

He is currently working as a European scout for the Florida Panthers.

Playing career
Nilsson began his career during the season of 1973–74, playing for Djurgårdens IF during his first of four seasons in Sweden. He then came to North America, and played for the Winnipeg Jets of the World Hockey Association (WHA) beginning in 1977. He scored two consecutive 100-point seasons in the WHA, and his offensive production continued when the league merged with the NHL. He was claimed by the Atlanta Flames, and in his first season with the team he scored 93 points. The next season, 1980–81, the Flames moved to Calgary; Nilsson scored 131 points, which is still the team record, and he came third in NHL scoring.

Nilsson played with the Flames, wearing number 14, until 1984–85 when he was traded to the Minnesota North Stars for a draft pick that the Flames used to draft Joe Nieuwendyk. Nilsson won his first and only Stanley Cup while playing with the Edmonton Oilers in 1987. He returned to Europe after that season, playing in Italy, Switzerland, Sweden, Austria, and Norway. In 1988–89 he was named Player of the Year in Sweden. He returned to Edmonton for six games in 1995, which made him the last former Atlanta Flames player to play in the NHL. He then played briefly again in Europe until 1998.

Nilsson holds the NHL record for the quickest goal scored during a season-opening game, at ten seconds in, while playing for the North Stars versus the Quebec Nordiques on October 11, 1986.

Awards

World Hockey Association
Won Lou Kaplan Trophy (WHA Rookie of the Year) (1978)
Won Paul Daneau Trophy (WHA Most Gentlemanly Player) (1979)
1977-78 - WHA - Avco Cup (Winnipeg)
1978-79 - WHA - Avco Cup (Winnipeg)
Inaugural member of the World Hockey Association Hall of Fame (2010)

National Hockey League
Played in NHL All-Star Game (1980, 1981)
1986–87 – NHL – Stanley Cup (Edmonton)

Sweden and International ice hockey
Member of the Swedish World All-Star Team (1985, 1989, 1990)
Named Swedish Player of the Year (1989)
Inducted into the IIHF Hall of Fame (2006)
Inducted into the Swedish Hockey Hall of Fame (2012)

Records
Most points scored by a Swedish player in a single NHL season (131 in 1980–81)
Calgary Flames team record for points in a single season (131 in 1980–81)
Calgary Flames team record for assists in a single season  (82 in 1980–81)
Calgary Flames team record for shorthanded goals in a single season (9 in 1983–84)

Career statistics

Regular season and playoffs

International

Family
Nilsson has been married since 2005 to Swedish golfer Helen Alfredsson. He occasionally caddies for her in professional events. He is also the father of Robert Nilsson, a former Edmonton Oilers player, from an earlier marriage.

References

External links
 

1956 births
Living people
AIK IF players
Atlanta Flames draft picks
Atlanta Flames players
Bolzano HC players
Calgary Flames players
Djurgårdens IF Hockey players
EC Graz players
Edmonton Oilers players
Edmonton Oilers scouts
Florida Panthers scouts
HC Lugano players
IIHF Hall of Fame inductees
EHC Kloten players
Minnesota North Stars players
People from Nynäshamn Municipality
Stanley Cup champions
Swedish expatriate ice hockey players in Canada
Swedish expatriate ice hockey players in the United States
Swedish ice hockey centres
Toronto Toros draft picks
Vålerenga Ishockey players
Winnipeg Jets (WHA) players
Sportspeople from Stockholm County
Swedish expatriate sportspeople in Switzerland
Swedish expatriate sportspeople in Italy
Swedish expatriate sportspeople in Norway
Swedish expatriate sportspeople in Austria
Swedish expatriate sportspeople in Spain
Swedish expatriate sportspeople in Germany
Expatriate ice hockey players in Switzerland
Expatriate ice hockey players in Italy
Expatriate ice hockey players in Norway
Expatriate ice hockey players in Austria
Expatriate ice hockey players in Spain
Expatriate ice hockey players in Germany